The Okehocking Tribe (also known as Ockanickon) was a small band of Unami language-speaking  Delaware Indians, who occupied an area along the Ridley and Crum creeks in Chester County, Pennsylvania. Part of that area is now known as Ridley Creek State Park. Along with the Schuylkill and Brandywine Indians, the Okehocking were known as Unami or "people down the river" by other tribes, in accordance with the Indian way of designating a tribe by geographical location.

Establishment of villages 

In 1701, the tribe approached William Penn for the purchase of a tract of land. Penn allotted them 500 acres. The tribe used the land as their summer fishing camp, moving north during the winter months.

At that time, English and European settlers were not allowed to purchase or occupy any land occupied by Indians. Because settlers could not be certain where the boundary lay around Indian land, they tended to build settlements well away from Indian encampments. However, the survey of the 500 acres allotted to the Okehocking Tribe allowed a clear demarcation of where Indian land began and ended. This meant that the settlers could freely camp and build settlements all around the borders without fear of breaking the law. 
Later, feeling surrounded by colonial settlers, the Okehocking moved west toward the Susquehanna River and later settled in the Ohio River Valley.

See also 
Okehocking Historic District, about 7 miles west of Newtown Square, Pennsylvania

References

External links 

 Delaware Nation, official website
 Delaware Tribe of Indians, official website
 Lenni Lenape Historical Society
 Lenape/English dictionary
 Lenape (Southern Unami) Talking Dictionary

Lenape
Algonquian peoples
Native American history of Pennsylvania
Native American tribes in Pennsylvania